Stival is a surname. Notable people with the surname include:
 Alexi Stival (born 1963), Brazilian footballer and manager known as "Cuca"
 Avlamir Dirceo Stival (born 1969), Brazilian footballer and manager known as "Cuquinha"
 Daniele Stival (born 1962), Italian politician
 Giulio Stival (1902–1953), Italian actor